"Woman in Love" is a song by Barbra Streisand from her 1980 album Guilty.

Woman in Love may also refer to:

 "A Woman in Love", a song by Frank Loesser for the 1955 cinematic adaptation of the Broadway musical Guys and Dolls
 "Woman in Love" (Three Degrees song), a 1979 song by Three Degrees
 "A Woman in Love (It's Not Me)", a song by Tom Petty and the Heartbreakers from the 1981 album Hard Promises
 "A Woman in Love" (Ronnie Milsap song), a song by Ronnie Milsap from the 1989 album Stranger Things Have Happened

See also
 Women in Love (disambiguation)